Luhya (also Luyia, Luhia or Luhiya) is a Bantu language of western Kenya.

Dialects
The various Luhya tribes speak several related languages and dialects, though some of them are no closer to each other than they are to neighboring non-Luhya languages. For example, the Bukusu people are ethnically Luhya, but the Bukusu dialect is a variety of Masaba. (See Luhya people for details.) However, there is a core of mutually intelligible dialects that comprise Luhya proper:
Hanga 
Tsotso 
Marama 
Kisa 
Kabras 
East Nyala

Comparison 
A comparison between two dialects of Luhya proper, and to two other Bantu languages spoken by the Luhya:

Comparison to Bantu

Phonology 
The following is the phonology of the Luwanga dialect:

Vowels

Consonants

External links 
Eshitabo Eshiokhulaama nende Tsisakalamendo nende Akebiima Bindi Bieikanisa 1967 Anglican liturgical text digitized by Richard Mammana

References

Musimbi Kanyoro (1989), "The Abaluyia of Kenya; one people, one language: What can be learned from the Luyia project": The Abaluyia of Western Kenya. (p. 27).
Wanga-English Dictionary